Jon McNaughton is an American artist and Republican activist. He is known for his paintings depicting American conservative political figures, in particular prominent Republicans, and Christian imagery.

Career
McNaughton is from Provo, Utah, and studied art at Brigham Young University. After graduating, he worked in finance for eight years, planning on saving up money before working in art full time.

His early work mainly dealt with landscapes, and religious and Mormon-related subjects, which over time moved towards right-wing politics. He painted his first political artworks during the 2008 US presidential election, and then came to prominence in 2009 during the Obama presidency, when he started painting more conservative-leaning political scenes.

In 2012, Rachel Maddow's blog used his work The Forgotten Man as a caption contest, which led to an increase in sales for McNaughton.

Reception
His work has been described as "Christian nationalist" by Andrew Seidel of the Freedom From Religion Foundation, "kitsch realist", and as a middle ground between realism and impressionism. Alissa Wilkinson in Vox described McNaughton as the "single most famous pro-Trump artist", and Monica Hesse described him as "one of the most significant painters of the current era".

Commentators, including Ben Davis and Jennifer Greenhill, professor of art history at University of Southern California, have said that his work is primarily designed for "digital consumption", and highlighted the links between his paintings and internet memes and internet culture. His artworks often go viral. Others, such as Greenhill and Andrew O'Hehir in Salon, have highlighted how McNaughton's knowledge of art history allows him to use famous historical paintings to complement his messages.

Ben Davis has described McNaughton's art as "always ... mediocre", and as "highly functional memes". He further compared McNaughton to religious artist Harry Anderson, and wrote that although many Twitter users think that McNaughton's artwork is to "trigger the libs", McNaughton is trying to represent an honestly held viewpoint by some Trump supporters. McNaughton himself stated that he doesn't intend to "trigger liberals", but rather "to inspire". His work is often criticized by "coastal critics" and other liberals in the US, including Stephen Colbert and Jerry Saltz.

Steve Rose in The Guardian, while describing The Forgotten Man, identified McNaughton's work in the tradition of Norman Rockwell. Rose went on to say that McNaughton's art "provokes derision and parody more than outrage".

John McDonald in The Sydney Morning Herald described McNaughton's work as "pure propaganda", and went on to say that it provokes "similar feeling[s] of self-satisfaction that grips liberal-minded viewers ... looking at a work that celebrates a feminist or anti-racist position".

Personal life
McNaughton is married, a devout member of The Church of Jesus Christ of Latter-day Saints, and went on a  mission for his faith to Japan in his youth. In the 2016 Republican Party presidential primaries, McNaughton supported Ted Cruz, and following Trump's victory, described himself as a "Trump observer" instead of a supporter.

See also 
 Thomas Kinkade

References

External links

Living people
Year of birth missing (living people)
Painters from Utah
Brigham Young University alumni
Latter Day Saints from Utah
Latter Day Saint artists
Artists from Provo, Utah
Political artists